Sommesnil is a commune in the Seine-Maritime department in the Normandy region in northern France.

Geography

Population

Places of interest
 The church of St. Firmin, dating from the nineteenth century.
 A seventeenth-century chateau. The chateau was built in 1620 by Louis XIII on the site of a medieval chateau as a base for hunting. Louis XIII built the two fine Medici gates which still exist in honour of his mother  Marie de  Medici [1575-1642]. She was the wife of Henry IV and Queen of France. The Chateau was later Inhabited by the family Bigot who were involved in the parliament at Rouen. Over the years it has been a home, a medical centre and used by the German and United States armies in WW2. It has original ceilings and panelled dining room, an original kitchen with fireplace, an impressive staircase and cour d'honneur with fine tapestries. The chateau has been undergoing a full restoration by the current owner.
 The chapel of Notre-Dame. This is a small Chapel much revered by the community of Sommesnil  who hold an annual service and procession  between the chapel and the church of St Firmin. The chapel was originally owned by the château of Sommesnil  but was donated by the present owner of the chateau to the community of Sommesnil.

See also
Communes of the Seine-Maritime department

References

Communes of Seine-Maritime